"Takeaway" is a song by American production duo The Chainsmokers and American EDM musician Illenium, featuring Canadian singer Lennon Stella. It was released as a single on July 24, 2019, along with its music video, serving as the fifth single from both artists' third studio albums World War Joy and Ascend, respectively. The single became The Chainsmokers' seventh, and both Illenium's and Stella's first, number one on Billboard's Dance/Mix Show Airplay Chart in November 2019.

Music video 
The music video, directed by Jeremiah Davis and produced by That One Blond Kid Corp,  was uploaded to YouTube on July 24, 2019.

The video was filmed in New York City at the Vessel, a massive staircase sculpture in the Hudson Yards development. The interactive art installation is the work of Thomas Heatherwick.

Charts

Weekly charts

Year-end charts

Certifications

Release history

Notes

References

2019 singles
2019 songs
The Chainsmokers songs
Illenium songs
Lennon Stella songs
Songs written by Andrew Taggart
Songs written by Alex Pall
Songs written by Sorana (singer)
Songs written by Freedo (producer)
Future bass songs
Songs written by Illenium